Hydrotarsus is a genus of beetles in family Dytiscidae. Many include it in Hydroporus today.

Species include:
 Hydrotarsus compunctus
 Hydrotarsus pilosus

References 

Dytiscidae genera
Taxonomy articles created by Polbot